is a Multi-purpose stadium and indoor/outdoor athletic complex in Suzuka, Mie, Japan. It was opened in 1992. It includes an indoor swimming pool, multiple gyms and climbing wall and multiple rugby/soccer fields. The main stadium is also the home of the Honda Heat who play in Japan Rugby League One and the Suzuka Point Getters of the Japan Football League. It has a capacity of 12,000.

Sport in Suzuka, Mie
Multi-purpose stadiums in Japan
Rugby union stadiums in Japan
Football venues in Japan
Sports venues in Mie Prefecture
1992 establishments in Japan
Sports venues completed in 1992